State Route 370 (SR 370) is a  north–south state highway located entirely within Early County in the southwestern part of the U.S. state of Georgia. It travels parallel to the Chattahoochee River for its entire length. The southernmost  is part of the Blakely Highway. The rest of the highway is known as Great Southern Highway. The roadway's construction began in the early 1960s. Later that decade, the Blakely Highway section was included as part of former SR 363. In 1970, the road was designated as SR 370.

Route description
SR 370 begins at an intersection with US 84/SR 38 (Hugh D. Broome, Sr. Parkway) northwest of Jakin. Finally, the route curves to a nearly due north routing and meets its northern terminus, an intersection with SR 62 (Columbia Highway) in Hilton. SR 370 is the first and last state route on State Route 62 and 84.

SR 370 is not part of the National Highway System, a system of roadways important to the nation's economy, defense, and mobility.

History
In 1967, this entire segment was designated as part of SR 363. It is unclear if it traveled concurrent with SR 363 south of the southern end of this segment. Between 1984 and 1986, SR 363 was decommissioned. SR 370 was designated along its current length.

Major intersections

See also

References

External links

 Georgia Roads (Routes 361 - 380)

370
Transportation in Early County, Georgia